Tassano is a surname. Notable people with the surname include:

Cristian Marcelo González Tassano (born 1996), Uruguayan footballer
Fabian Tassano (born 1963), German-born British economist
Fortunato Brescia Tassano (d. 1951), Peruvian businessman
Luis Barrios Tassano (1935-1991), Uruguayan lawyer and diplomat